Lizzie is a 1957 American film noir drama film directed by Hugo Haas. The film is based on the 1954 novel The Bird's Nest by Shirley Jackson and stars Eleanor Parker, Richard Boone and Joan Blondell. The popular songs "It's Not for Me to Say" and "Warm and Tender" were written for this film, and performed by Johnny Mathis, who played a piano player/singer in the film. (Both songs were subsequently included in Mathis' fifth album, Johnny's Greatest Hits). The film was produced by MGM Studios.

Plot
Elizabeth (Eleanor Parker) has recurring headaches and is plagued with insomnia. She is receiving letters from a woman called Lizzie, but Elizabeth can't remember knowing anyone named Lizzie. When Elizabeth is under hypnosis, her psychiatrist, Dr. Wright (Richard Boone), discovers Elizabeth has three personalities: The shy Elizabeth, the Mr. Hyde-like Lizzie, and the kind, well-adjusted Beth, the woman she always should have been. It is up to Dr. Wright to help Elizabeth to become Beth completely.

Cast
 Eleanor Parker as Elizabeth Richmondt
 Richard Boone as Dr. Neal Wright
 Joan Blondell as Aunt Morgan
 Hugo Haas as Walter Brenner
 Ric Roman as Johnny Valenzo
 Dorothy Arnold as Elizabeth's mother
 Marion Ross as Ruth Seaton
 Johnny Mathis as Piano Singer

Production
Johnny Mathis made his film debut in Lizzie. The second song he sings in the film, “It's Not for Me to Say," became one of his biggest hits.

TCM.com reports that Lizzie's producers sued Fox to postpone release of the film The Three Faces of Eve, starring Joanne Woodward, because of the similarity of their plots. Fox did delay until early in 1957, after the publication of the biography on which The Three Faces of Eve was based.

Reception
According to MGM records the film earned $280,000 in the US and Canada and $275,000 elsewhere, resulting in a loss of $154,000.

Shirley Jackson, the author of the novel on which Lizzie was based, was reportedly unimpressed with the screenplay, writing "I have read the screen play and it sounds a little like Ma and Pa Kettle, or Abbott and Costello meet a multiple personality." but when she saw the movie itself, she "thought it was extremely good, and enormously improved over the first script I saw."

See also
 List of American films of 1957

References

External links
 
 
 
 

1957 films
1957 drama films
American drama films
Films directed by Hugo Haas
Films based on American novels
Films about psychiatry
Films about hypnosis
Films about dissociative identity disorder
Insomnia in film
American black-and-white films
Metro-Goldwyn-Mayer films
Bryna Productions films
Films based on works by Shirley Jackson
Films scored by Leith Stevens
1950s English-language films
1950s American films